Formosa Boulevard is a station of Kaohsiung Metro located in Sinsing District, Kaohsiung. It is currently the sole interchange station between metro lines in Kaohsiung.

Formosa Boulevard station is named after the Formosa Boulevard project, a remodelling of Kaohsiung's Jhongshan Road in preparation for the 2009 World Games. Formosa Boulevard is in turn named after the Formosa Incident. Transferring from the Red line to the Orange line (or vice versa) takes roughly 4 minutes.

Station Design

The station is a three-level, underground station with an island platform and two side platforms. It is located at the junction of Jhongjheng and Jhongshan Road and has 11 exits. The Orange Line station is 334 metres long, while the Red Line station is 209 metres long.

The station is known for its "Dome of Light", the largest glass work in the world. It was designed by Italian artist Narcissus Quagliata. It is 30 metres in diameter and covers an area of 2,180 square metres. It is made up of 4,500 glass panels. The dome will be offered as venues for weddings.

Another spectacular feature of the station are the four glass pedestrian entrances that lead from street level down into the station, designed by renowned Japanese architecture firm, Shin Takamatsu Architect & Associates.

Around the Station
Liuhe Night Market
Kaohsiung General Post Office
Sinsing Market
Nanhua Shopping Street
Kaohsiung Police Department, Sinsing Branch
Jhongshan and Jhongjheng Road Wedding Street

References

External links

KRTC Public Art Center / Formosa Boulevard Station

2008 establishments in Taiwan
Kaohsiung Metro Red line stations
Kaohsiung Metro Orange line stations
Railway stations opened in 2008